A window well cover is a sheet of material manufactured to fit over the top of an exposed window well to cover the well and basement window. Its purpose is to prevent accidental falls inside the window well and to prevent buildup of water, snow, and debris in the window well which could lead to basement flooding.

Materials 
Window well covers are available in different materials:
 Plastic material, mainly polyethylene and polycarbonate (a thermoplastic)
 Metal material, mainly aluminium and steel. When a window well cover is made out of this material, it is commonly referred to as a window well grate.  

Polycarbonate window well covers provide added durability over their polyethylene counterparts. Covers made from polycarbonate are more than 200 times stronger than covers made from polyethylene and can withstand temperature changes with less expansion.  

Window well covers made from metal typically only allow air-flow and protection from large objects entering the window well such as people, large falling debris, and large pets. These style of covers can be combined with a clear plastic top cover made of polycarbonate or polyethylene to provide protection from water, snow, and smaller debris.

How to purchase a window well cover 
Window well covers can be purchased from several sources including on-line retailers and major home improvement stores.  Generally, these sources carry pre-made sizes which may not fit your window well perfectly.
Some sources offer a way for the homeowner to take measurements and send them in so the manufacturer can create a window well cover that is designed specifically for the size and shape of your well. While these 
covers may work ok, they are generally made with lighter weight materials and may not last for the life of your home.  One of the best solutions is to contact a company who specializes in on-site fabrication of polycarbonate window
well covers.  These companies will come out to your home to and build a perfectly fit cover for each window well.  These companies tend to use higher quality materials and since they built right on-site the fit
is always perfect.  Search the web under terms like on-site custom window well covers to find vendors serving your area.

Home inspection requirements 
Regarding window well cover strength and operation, the International Code Council (ICC) 2007 edition, Section 3.4, states that window well covers shall support "a minimum live load of 40 pounds per square foot. The cover shall be operable from within the window well without the use of tools or special knowledge, and shall require no more than 30 pounds of force to fully open."

Depending on the type of basement window, and if the basement window extends above the well, a window well cover may be required to allow enough clearance for the basement window to open properly in case of emergency egress. Casement, hopper, and awning style basement windows require extra room in order to function properly.

Liability 
There have been historical instances where unprotected window wells have been the center of lawsuits against homeowners and landlords.
In the case of MULL v. KERSTETTER 373 Pa.Super. 228 (1988), a volunteer firefighter was injured after falling into an unprotected window well, the court ruled that a police officer entering land in his or her official capacity, and in response to a call for assistance, is viewed as a “licensee”, and is therefore owed the same duty of care that any citizen who is permitted to be on the property would receive.

References 

Building materials